Sageraea grandiflora is a species of plant in the Annonaceae family. It is endemic to Kerala, India. It is threatened by habitat loss.

References

Annonaceae
Flora of Kerala
Endangered plants
Taxonomy articles created by Polbot